Teymurabad (also Romanized as Teymūrābād) is a village in Qoroq Rural District, Baharan District, Gorgan County, Golestan Province, Iran. At the 2006 census, its population was 300, in 71 families.

References 

Populated places in Gorgan County